Veliki Brat VIP 2013 also known as Veliki Brat VIP 5 (short VBVIP5) was the fifth celebrity season of the Serbian production of Veliki Brat. It premiered on 25 March 2013 on B92 as the first season to be broadcast on this channel since Veliki Brat 2009 and the first celebrity season since Veliki Brat VIP 2008. The season lasted 43 days until the live finale on 6 May 2013. The winner is Žarko Stojanović.

Many celebrities were rumored to be the housemates, some of the including Boris Novković, Samantha Fox, Milić Vukašinović, Lepa Lukić, Saška Janković and some former housemates from the regular season. Producers did not want to comment on the speculations, and did not confirm nor dismiss the rumors. On the day before the launch of the season paparazzi managed to capture some of the celebrities while entering the quarantine, but all of them were masked.

The design of the house was revealed on 21 March 2013 and the pictures showed that the house design is quite similar to the one used for the previous regular season. Marijana Mićić hosted the show once again, but Ana Mihajlovski was her co-host for the live launch. This was the first season that Ana hosted since Veliki Brat VIP 2008.

This season saw the return of the nominations by the housemates, but for the first time the public voted to save their favourite housemates out of the three or more nominated. The season uses the same eye logo as the previous regular season and the eleventh British series.

Housemates
Sixteen housemates entered show on Day 1. On Day 8, Vendi Entered The House.

Weekly summary

Nominations table

Notes

Controversy and criticism

Animal harm and exploitation
During week 2, while doing the shopping task Ava, Maja Nikolić and Vendi had to go in a dark room which had over 300 mice in it; they had to feel and walk around the room which had no light in it and stepped on some of the animals that were in there. After several viewers complained the producers said that no animals were severely harmed during the task and apologized for upsetting the viewers. Several animal rights organizations said that they will press charges against Emotion.
Later, in week 4 of the season, in a live stream of the show, Vendi was heard talking about a problem with stray dogs in her neighborhood. She said that the dogs were getting aggressive, and that because the local government did not do anything about it she tried poisoning the stray dogs herself. She also added that the poison did not work and that her neighbour wanted to shoot the dogs with a gun, but he was stopped by a policeman. This caused an outrage with the viewers who launched a petition against Vendi. The petition stated that Vendi should get ejected from the house and that she should face charges for violence against animals. Several animal rights organisations stated that they will prosecute Vendi once she leaves the house.

Contact with the outside world
According to Kurir, during a live stream broadcast, Nevena was interviewed in the Diary room. In the interview, Nevena said, "It's not fair that some of the housemates are allowed to call and talk with their family!". Seconds after she said this, the audio was censored with the sound that the producers use to cover up the swearing. It is assumed that the housemate with the phone privilege is Sindi, since she was talking about their conflicts shortly before that. Producers refused to comment on this event.

References

2013 Serbian television seasons
05